James Scott Young (December 3, 1848 – February 25, 1914) was a United States district judge of the United States District Court for the Western District of Pennsylvania.

Education and career

Born in Pittsburgh, Pennsylvania, Young received an Artium Baccalaureus degree from Washington & Jefferson College in 1869 and read law to enter the bar in 1872. He was in private practice in Pittsburgh from 1872 to 1902. He was the United States Attorney for the Western District of Pennsylvania from 1902 to 1905. He was a Judge of the Court of Common Pleas of Allegheny County, Pennsylvania from 1905 to 1908.

Federal judicial service

On January 14, 1908, Young was nominated by President Theodore Roosevelt to a seat on the United States District Court for the Western District of Pennsylvania vacated by Judge Nathaniel Ewing. Young was confirmed by the United States Senate on January 22, 1908, and received his commission the same day, serving in that capacity until his death on February 25, 1914.

References

Sources
 

1848 births
1914 deaths
Washington & Jefferson College alumni
Judges of the United States District Court for the Western District of Pennsylvania
20th-century American judges
United States federal judges admitted to the practice of law by reading law
United States Attorneys for the Western District of Pennsylvania
United States district court judges appointed by Theodore Roosevelt
19th-century American judges